Abbey Field is an urban settlement in Essex, adjacent to Colchester city centre and New Town. It is home to many community events in Colchester.

References

Colchester (town)